Thomas Martin Davis (22 January 1856 – 14 July 1899) was an English-born Australian politician.

He was born in Redditch in Worcestershire to fruit merchant Thomas Davis and Ann Martin. The family moved to Glasgow in 1859, where Thomas was educated. He moved to France at the age of thirteen, but was forced to return to England when the Franco-Prussian War broke out in 1870. From 1871 to 1875 he was a sailor; he then worked as an interpreter in New Caledonia before settling in Sydney as a seaman in 1876. Closely involved in the union movement, he was secretary of the Federated Seamen's Union in 1886. In 1891 he was a foundation member of the Labor Party, and he was elected to the New South Wales Legislative Assembly accordingly to represent West Sydney. One of a minority of Labor members to sign the pledge on binding votes, he was re-elected as the member for Sydney-Pyrmont in 1894 and 1895. He retired in 1898 and died in Sydney the following year. He had married Jessie Shaw on 9 May 1892; they had three sons.

References

 

1856 births
1899 deaths
Members of the New South Wales Legislative Assembly
Australian Labor Party members of the Parliament of New South Wales
19th-century Australian politicians